Kentucky Route 1927 (KY 1927) is a  east–west state highway located in and around the cities of Lexington and Winchester, Kentucky. The western terminus of the route is at Kentucky Route 4 (East New Circle Road) east of downtown Lexington. The eastern terminus is at Kentucky Route 627 in downtown Winchester. KY 1927, along with U.S. Route 60 and Interstate 64 to the north, is one of three routes directly connecting Lexington to Winchester. In rural western Clark and eastern Fayette this road is considered one of the most dangerous because of its curves and trees. Many fatal accidents on this road has occurred more than any other major highway, road, or street in Winchester and Lexington.

The road is known by several names along its length, including Liberty Road, Todds Road, Colby Road, and Belmont Avenue.

Major intersections

See also 
 Roads of Lexington, Kentucky

References

External links
 Official website of Lexington Area Metropolitan Planning Organization
 
 

1927
Transportation in Clark County, Kentucky
Transportation in Lexington, Kentucky